The 1934 SMU Mustangs football team represented Southern Methodist University (SMU) as a member of the Southwest Conference (SWC) during the 1934 college football season. Led by Ray Morrison in his 15th and final season as head coach, the Mustangs compiled an overall record of 8–2–2 with a mark of 3–2–1 in conference play, placing third in the SWC.

Schedule

References

SMU
SMU Mustangs football seasons
SMU Mustangs football